51 may refer to:
 51 (number)
 The year
 51 BC
 AD 51
 1951
 2051
 51 (film), a 2011 American horror film directed by Jason Connery
 "Fifty-One", an episode of the American television drama series Breaking Bad 
 51 (album), a 2012 mixtape by rapper Kool A.D.
 "Fifty One", a song by Karma to Burn from the album V, 2011